Sidi Ali Bounab is a mountain in Algeria, about 800 m in height, shared between the wilayas of Tizi Ouzou and Boumerdes.  It overlooks the plain of Tadmaït.  Its forests are composed mainly of cork oak. 

In 1949 it was the scene of a "punitive expedition" by French gendarmes against the villages of the mountain.

Notes

Mountains of Algeria